Sheldon Adalbert "Larry" LeJeune (July 22, 1885–April 21, 1952) was a Major League Baseball outfielder who played parts of two seasons in the major leagues for the Brooklyn Dodgers and the Pittsburgh Pirates.

In 1910, at a competition in Cincinnati, LeJeune threw a baseball , setting a world record.

References

External links

1885 births
1952 deaths
Major League Baseball outfielders
Brooklyn Dodgers players
Pittsburgh Pirates players
Baseball players from Michigan
Springfield Babes (baseball) players
Dubuque Dubs players
Grays Harbor Grays players
Evansville River Rats players
Chattanooga Lookouts players
Grand Rapids Black Sox players
Grand Rapids Bill-eds players
Sioux City Indians players